"Hello!" (stylized as "HELLO!") is the debut single by Japanese-American recording artist Joe Inoue. It is the first single from his album Me! Me! Me!. The single peaked on the Oricon Weekly Singles Charts at 189, remaining on the charts for only one week. The A-side was used as the theme song for the 21st Century Edison variety show and was also used in commercials for Glico's Pocky product. Both the title track and the B-side "One Man Band" appear on Me! Me! Me!.

Track listing
 "Hello!" – 3:45
 "One Man Band" – 3:39
  – 3:42
 "Hello!-instrumental-" – 3:46

References

External links
 Joe Inoue's official website  

2008 singles
Joe Inoue songs
2008 songs
Ki/oon Music singles